Biennial means (an event) lasting for two years or occurring every two years. The related term biennium is used in reference to a period of two years.

In particular, it can refer to:
 Biennial plant, a plant which blooms in its second year and then dies
 Biennale, the Italian word for "biennial" and a term used within the art world to describe an international exhibition of contemporary art, stemming from the use of the phrase for the Venice Biennale. (The English form, "biennial", is also commonly used to describe these art events.)

See also 

 Biannual, meaning twice a year
 Biennial bearing trees, which produce fruit once every two years

Units of time